Football referee may refer to the following articles
Official (American football)
Official (Canadian football)
Referee (association football)

See also
Umpire (Australian rules football)